Kari is  either a male or female given name, or a surname.

Given name
In Finland, Kari is a male name, which was particularly popular in the 1940s and 1950s. The name is derived from the Greek Makarios (or Macarius).

In Norway, Kari is a female name. The name is diminutive of Katherine, meaning "pure". The corresponding Swedish and German name is Karin.

In Iceland and Faroe Islands, Kári is a male name, based on a Scandinavian god of wind of the same name. The corresponding Norwegian male name is Kåre.

Surname

Kari is a popular surname in South India. In Andhra Pradesh the village of Karivari Palem is named after the surname; in the village Inkollu, Gangavaram almost 60% families have this surname and belongs to Kamma/Chowdary caste. Kari can also be spelt Kahri.

Kari is also a Finnish surname, meaning a small island, islet, or an underwater rock. There are currently 2242 holders of the name (2015).

Notable people named Kari

Females with the given name

Kari Aas (1886–1978), Norwegian teacher and Scout leader 
 Kari Anderson (born 1982), Scottish cricketer
 Kari Bøge (born 1950), Norwegian author
 Kari Bremnes (born 1956), Norwegian singer
 Kari Byron (born 1974), American television host and artist
 Kari Corbett (born 1984), Scottish actress
 Kari Diesen (1914–1987), Norwegian singer and actress
 Kari Faux (born 1992), American rapper and singer, born Kari Rose Johnson
 Kari Aalvik Grimsbø (born 1985), Norwegian handball player
 Kari Jobe (born 1981), American singer
 Kari Kjønaas Kjos (born 1962), Norwegian politician
 Kari Mette Johansen (born 1979), Norwegian handball player
 Kari Ann Lake (born 1969), American politician and former television news anchor
 Kari Matchett (born 1970), Canadian actress
 Kari Nissena, American actress
 Kari Ann Peniche (born 1984), American model
 Kari Rueslåtten (born 1973), Norwegian singer
 Kari Storækre (born 1950), Norwegian television personality
 Kari Swenson (born 1962), American biathlete
 Kari Sylwan (born 1940), Swedish actress, ballerina and choreographer
 Kari Tauring (born 1966), American folk singer, author, and teacher
 Kari Traa (born 1974), Norwegian skier
 Kari Wahlgren (born 1977), American voice actress
 Kari Wuhrer (born 1967), American actress

Males with the given name

 Kari Arkivuo, Finnish footballer
 Kari Aronpuro, Finnish poet
 Kari Eloranta, Finnish footballer and ice hockey player
 Kari Enqvist, Finnish physicist and writer
 Kari Hotakainen, Finnish writer
 Kári P. Højgaard, Faroese politician
 Kari Häkämies, Finnish politician 
 Kari Härkönen, Finnish skier
 Kari Jalonen, Finnish ice hockey coach
 Kari Kairamo, former CEO of Nokia
 Kari Ketonen, Finnish actor
 Kari Korhonen, Finnish cartoonist
 Kari Korhonen, Finnish mycologist
 Kari Kriikku, Finnish clarinet player
 Kari Kuivalainen, Finnish musician
 Kari Lehtola, Finnish major accident investigator
 Kari Lehtonen, Finnish NHL Goaltender for the Dallas Stars
 Kari Makkonen, Finnish ice hockey player
 Kari Mannerla, Finnish game designer
 Kari Mäkinen, Archbishop of Turku
 Kari Peitsamo, Finnish musician
 Kari Rajamäki, Finnish politician
 Kari Ristanen, Finnish skier
 Kári Stefánsson, Icelandic founder of deCODE genetics
 Kari Suomalainen, Finnish cartoonist
 Kari Takko, Finnish ice hockey goalkeeper
 Kari Tapio, Finnish singer
 Kari Tiainen, Finnish motorcycle rider
 Kari S. Tikka, Finnish legal scholar
 Kari Turunen, Finnish musician
 Kari Ukkonen, Finnish footballer
 Kari Uotila, Finnish politician
 Kari Väänänen, Finnish actor and director
 Kari Ylianttila, Finnish ski-jumper

People with the surname
 Dagur Kári, Icelandic filmmaker
 Jarkko Kari, Finnish mathematician
 Mika Kari (born 1967), Finnish politician
 Sax Kari, born Isaac Toombs, American R&B musician and promoter
 Tamla Kari, British actress
 Tommi Kari, Finnish footballer

People with the nickname
 Sundaram Karivardhan, Indian motor sports promoter

Fictional and mythological characters
 Kári, son of Fornjót, the personification of wind in Norse mythology
 Kari Grandi, Finnish advertising character
 Hikari "Kari" Kamiya, a character in Digimon media
 Kari Nordmann, Norwegian placeholder name
Kari Sorjonen, main character in Bordertown, a Finnish crime drama TV series

See also

 Cari (name)
Kali (name)
Karie (name)
Karli (name)
Karri (name)

References

Finnish-language surnames
Finnish masculine given names
Norwegian feminine given names